This is a list of Manik Bandyopadhyay's (19 May 1908 - 3 December 1956) works.

Novels
 Janani (1935)
 Dibaratrir Kabya (1935)
 Putulnacher Itikatha (1936)
 Padma Nadir Majhi (1936)
 Jibaner Jotilata (1936)
 Amritasya Putrah (1938)
 Sahartali - Pratham Parva (1940)
 Ahimsa (1941)
 Sahartali - Dwitiya Parva (1941)
 Chatushkon (1942)
 Dhorabandha Jiban (1942)
 Pratibimba (1944)
 Darpan (1945)
 Sahar Baser Itikatha (1946)
 Chintamoni (1946)
 Chinho (1947)
 Aadaayer Itihaas (1947)
 Jiyanta (1950)
 Pesha (1951–52)
 Sonar Cheye Dami (Part I - Bekar) (1951) 
 Swadhinatar Swad (1951)
 Chhandapatan (1951)
 Sonar Cheye Dami (Part II - Aaposh) (1952)
 Itikathar Porer Katha (1952)
 Pashapashi (1952)
 Sarbajanin (1952)
 Naagpaash (1953)
 Arogyo (1953)
 Chalchalan (1953)
 Teish Bochhor Age Pore (1953)
 Haraf (1954)
 Shubhashubho (1954)
 Paradhin Prem (1955)
 Holud Nodi Sabuj Bon (1956)
 Mashul (1956)
 Praneshwarer Upakhyan (1956, posthumous)
 Mati-Ghensha Manush (1957, posthumous)
 Majhir Chhele (1959, posthumous)
 Shantilata (1960, posthumous)

Short-story collection 
 Atasimami (1935)
 Atmahatmar adhikar
 Duhshashonio
 Haraner natjamai
 Shilpi
 Pragoitihasik (1937)
 Mihi o Mota Kahini (1938)
 Sarisrip (1939)
 Bou (1940)
 Samudrer Swad (1943)
 Bhejal (1944)
 Holud Pora (1945)
 Aj Kal Porshur Golpo (1946)
 Paristhiti (1946)
 Khatiyan (1947)
 Chhoto Boro (1948)
 Matir Mashul (1948)
 Chhotobokulpurer Jatri (1949)
 Feriwala (1953)
 Lajuklata (1953)
 Osohojogi

Drama
 Bhitemati (1946)

Prose collections 
 Lekhaker Katha (Essays, 1957, posthumous)
 Aprakashito Manik Bandyopadhyay (journals and letters, 1976, posthumous)

Poems 
 Manik Bandyopadhyayer Kabita (1970, posthumous)

Collections of works 
 Manik Bandyopadhyayer Sheshtho Galpo (stories, 1950)
 Manik Granthabali: Pratham Bhag (selected works, 1950–51)
 Manik Granthabali: Dwitiyo Bhag (selected works, 1951–52)
 Manik Bandyopadhyayer Swanirbachito Galpo (stories, 1956)
 Manik Bandyopadhyay Kishor Rachana Sambhar (juvenile literature, 2006)

References

Manik Bandyopadhyay
Bibliographies by writer